People's Artist of the Lithuanian SSR, is an honorary title awarded to citizens of the Lithuanian SSR in the Soviet Union. It is awarded for outstanding performance in the performing arts, whose merits are exceptional in the sphere of the development of the performing arts (theatre, music, dance, circus, cinema, etc.).

List of Recipients (Partial List) 
 Kazimiera Kymantaitė (1909-1999), Lithuanian film and actress and stage director
 Juozas Siparis
 Antanas Sodeika
 Kostantin Galkauskas
 Leonardas Zelchus
 Povilas Gaidys
 Gražina Balandytė
 Gediminas Karka
 Vytautas Paukste

See also 
 People's Artist of the USSR

References 

Lithuanian Soviet Socialist Republic
Honorary titles of the Soviet Union
People's Artists